The Tasmanian Environment Centre was an environment centre in  Hobart, Tasmania. It opened in December 1972 at 281 Elizabeth Street North Hobart and moved to 102 Bathurst Street in January 1975. The centre hosted bushwalking and other environmental group events and resources and produced publications about the local environment of Hobart, including educational curricula material.

The centre was the venue for foundation of the Tasmanian Wilderness Society in August 1976. In the late 1990s there was a shift in focus to urban sustainability issues and a name change to "Sustainable Living Tasmania".

References

Organisations based in Hobart
1972 establishments in Australia
Environment of Tasmania